Herbert Hunt (1880–1936) was an English footballer who played in the Football League for Glossop.

References

1880 births
1936 deaths
English footballers
Association football forwards
English Football League players
Glossop North End A.F.C. players
Sheffield United F.C. players
Rotherham Town F.C. (1899) players